Mario Clopatofsky (born 18 January 1958) is a Colombian former sports shooter. He competed in the men's 50 metre rifle three positions event at the 1984 Summer Olympics.

References

External links
 

1958 births
Living people
Colombian male sport shooters
Olympic shooters of Colombia
Shooters at the 1984 Summer Olympics
Place of birth missing (living people)
20th-century Colombian people
21st-century Colombian people